The Blinde Rot, also called the Adelmannsfelder Rot, is a river in the Ellwangen Hills in the north of the German state of Baden-Württemberg, that rises in the municipality Frankenhardt and discharges into the Kocher in the municipality of Abtsgmünd.

Geography
The Blinde Rot rises on the gravel sandstone plateau on the northern foothills of the Ellwangen Hills, flows shortly thereafter through the lake of Fleckenbachsee and then meanders southwards through river meadows, before swinging abruptly west in front of the Hornberg hill, about 2 km before emptying into the Kocher near Schäufele.

The whole length of its valley lies on the Middle Keuper rocks. Its neighbouring rivers, which run through valleys roughly parallel to the Blinde Rot to the west as east, the Bühler and the Jagst, both flow in the opposite direction, i.e. to the north.

Tributaries
The tributaries of the Blinde Rot from source to mouth are:

Environment and protected areas
The Blinde Rot initially flows through a very shallow depression, but from about Willa it cut more deeply and nowhere exceeds a maximum width of 150 metres. Mostly enclosed on both sides by wooded slopes, a small-scale, natural river landscape has survived on the valley floor. Pastures and meadows alternate here with woods, including elsewhere rare carrs. The river winds freely through both in natural meanders with steep and gently banks, accompanied by sandbanks, oxbow lakes and pools that are slowly silting up. 
The upper reaches the valley from the village of Bühlerzell to the hamlet of Grafenhof are designated as a protected landscape. This reserve was formed by a local act issued by the Ostalbkreis district office on 5 May 1994 and covers an area of 358 hectares.
Immediately thereafter until the Burghardmühle mill below Adelmannsfelden is the protected landscape known as the "Valley of the Blinde Rot". It covers 84.5 hectares and was established on 20 December 1968.

Fauna
The nature reserve of the Valley of the Blinde Rot (Naturschutzgebiet Tal der Blinde Rot) is a habitat rich in fauna.
In the valley, 28 breeding bird species have been observed, including the white-throated dipper, the common kingfisher, the Eurasian woodcock and the marsh warbler.
Two reptiles are native here: the viviparous lizard and slowworm, and the 7 species of amphibian include the fire salamander and yellow-bellied toad.
In the waters of the Blinde Rot live the rare river trout and the endangered brook lamprey, and on the floodplain are numerous species of butterfly and dragonfly.

Flora
Along the shore of the blind red are Alnus glutinosa and willows. In the extensively farmed wetlands still growing Trollius europaeus. In the wetlands to find the source bulrush and various sedges like the Yellow, the tassel visible, the felt and the fox sedge. An orchid that come Broad, the meat red and the rare green-winged orchid in the valley before, else the yellow aconite and the forest-Columbine.

Water quality
The blind was red with 2004 levels detected over her for this run from about the inflow of Geißbachs lightly loaded (class I-II).

History
In the catchment area, which is more than half covered by forests, forestry was formerly predominantly characterised by charcoal burning, resins,  and especially the extraction of timber. It was processed in sawmills into sawn timber, but most of it was used as fuel, turned into firewood for those living in the valley. Most of the timber from the forests was transported along the Blinde Rot and Kocher to Schwäbisch Hall where the saltworks had a great demand for firewood.

Sights and structures 
Fleckenbachsee lake and Fleckenbach Sawmill
Middle reaches of the river with oxbow lakes, sandstone rocks and several steep side valleys
St. James' pilgrimage church in Hohenberg in Rosenberg about 3 km east of the river at a height of 568 metres on the Zeugenberg
Adelmannsfelden Castle

Economy
Waterpower used to be used in the valley of the Blinde Rot to drive several sawmills, paper and oil mills. There is still a small sawmill at Betzenhof. On the Ludwigsmühle below Willa is a medium-sized woodmill. Hydropower is still used today at four locations in the valley.

Importance as a transport route
In the valley, there are hardly any roads along the river. Apart from, the L 1060 at Willa and the L 1073 in Adelmannsfelden are no maintained roads of more than local significance.

See also
List of rivers of Baden-Württemberg

References

Rivers of Baden-Württemberg
Ellwangen Hills
Rivers of Germany